Ka Wai Ola is a Hawaii-based newspaper published by the Office of Hawaiian Affairs.

The newspaper was first published in February 1984. As of 2017, the paper was distributed to over 60,000 people. It has some Hawaiian language columns.

The paper often covers Office of Hawaiian Affairs meetings.

Awards 

 Ka Wai Ola has received nine awards from the Native American Journalists Association, seven in 2020, and two in 2019.

See also 

 Hawaii Tribune-Herald
 Honolulu Star-Advertiser

References 

Newspapers published in Hawaii
Publications established in 1984